Bedford County Alms House, also known as Bedford County Home, is a historic almshouse and national historic district located at Bedford Township, Bedford County, Pennsylvania.  The district includes six contributing buildings.  They are the Alms House (1872-1873), infirmary building (1899), laundry (1900), and a storage shed and two barns built between the early 1900s and about 1950.  The Alms House is a four-story, brick building, 13-bays wide and 3-bays deep.  It has a hipped roof and features a central tower with porches.  The facility closed in 1978.

It was added to the National Register of Historic Places in 1988.

References

National Register of Historic Places in Bedford County, Pennsylvania
Italianate architecture in Pennsylvania
Buildings and structures in Bedford County, Pennsylvania
Historic districts on the National Register of Historic Places in Pennsylvania